Archbishop Padiyara Jubilee Memorial Matriculation Higher Secondary School known as A.P.J.M.Matriculation Higher Secondary School is a school located in Soosaipuram near Karungal in Kanyakumari district, Tamil Nadu, India. It was started in the memory of the Episcopal Silver Jubilee of Mar Antony Padiyara, who was then the Archbishop of Changanacherry.

References

https://schools.org.in/kanniyakumari/33300800320/a-p-j-m-matric-hr-sec-s-soosaipuram-karungal-p-o.html
 https://www.justdial.com/Kanyakumari/APJM-MATRIC-HR-SEC-SCHOOL-SOOSAIPURAM-Karinkal/9999P4653-4653-180205182548-Y4A5_BZDET
 http://www.apjm.edu.in/
 http://www.college2india.com/kanyakumari-private/apjm-matric-hr-sec-school-soosalpuram-apjm-matric-hr-sec-school-soosalpuram-karungal-629-157-kanyakumari-district-details.html

External links
 Official Website

Schools in Tamil Nadu